Závod is a village and municipality within the Malacky District in the Bratislava region of western Slovakia.  31 December 2009, the municipality had an area of 27.3 km2, population of 2784 inhabitants in 2016 and a population density of 101 people per km2.

Famous people
 Štefan Vrablec, Slovak Roman Catholic bishop

References 

^Statistical Office of The Slovak Republic, accessdate=2016-04-07; www.statistics.sk

References

External links

 Official page

Villages and municipalities in Malacky District